Events from the year 1570 in India.

Events

 War of the League of the Indies begins

Births
 Sengge Namgyal, Namgyal dynasty King of Ladakh (died 1642)

Deaths

See also

 Timeline of Indian history

References